Mordellistenomimus nanus is a species of beetle in the family Cerambycidae, the only species in the genus Mordellistenomimus.

References

Lepturinae